The Emei Menpai (门派) is a fictional martial arts school mentioned in several works of wuxia fiction. It is commonly featured as one of the leading orthodox schools in the jianghu (martial artists' community). It is named after the place where it is based, Mount Emei.

History 
In Jin Yong's The Heaven Sword and Dragon Saber, the Emei School is founded during the early Yuan dynasty by Guo Xiang around the same time as when the Wudang School is established. Guo Xiang is the sole surviving member of the Guo family from The Return of the Condor Heroes. She escapes during the Battle of Xiangyang with the Heaven Reliant Sword, becomes a powerful martial artist, and roams the jianghu as a youxia. At the age of 40, she becomes a Buddhist nun and establishes the Emei School on Mount Emei. Her apprentice, Abbess Fengling, succeeds her as the leader of the Emei School. Fengling is later, in turn, succeeded by Abbess Miejue.

In Jin Yong's works, the school's members are predominantly women and its leaders are Buddhist or Taoist nuns. In wuxia stories by other writers, the Emei School has members of both sexes, who play equally important roles in the school.

In Sword Stained with Royal Blood, set in the late Ming dynasty, the Emei School is briefly mentioned as one of the Four Great Sword Schools and has male members in its ranks. In Gu Long's The Kingdom of the Golden Bird of the Lu Xiaofeng Series, the Emei School is led by Dugu Yihe, who is slain by Ximen Chuixue.

Skills and martial arts 
In Jin Yong's novels, Emei's martial arts are the best among those suited for women. The origins of Emei's martial arts come from its founder, Guo Xiang. Guo Xiang's martial arts were mostly inherited from her family, including her maternal grandfather Huang Yaoshi. She also learnt part of the Nine Yang Manual from Jueyuan in her younger days. However, it does have some elements of "unorthodoxy", as exhibited by Zhou Zhiruo when she uses the "Nine Yin White Bone Claw" after finding the Nine Yin Manual.

Emei's martial arts range from powerful inner energy cultivation techniques to the use of weapons and unarmed combat. They encompass the Twelve Movements and the Six Specially Mastered Skills. Emei's members primarily use the sword. They also use needles and hairpins, called the "Prick of Emei" or "Jade Maiden Hairpin", as projectile weapons to be thrown at enemies. The most powerful of Emei's skills are the Emei Swordplay and the 36 styles of dianxue.

Like Wudang, Emei's skills have two sides to them, encompassing elements of "softness" and "roughness" and "long range" and "short range" attacks, all in the same style of fighting. They rotate between deceptive and direct attacks and can be used effectively by women to overcome opponents who are physically stronger than them. Some movements in Emei's swordplays are feminine in nature and are named after beauties in Chinese history and Chinese idioms used to describe feminine beauty.

See also 
 Mount Emei
 Emeiquan

Notes 

Organizations in Wuxia fiction